Kingdom of southern Italy may refer to:
Kingdom of Sicily 1130–1282. A kingdom comprising southern Italy prior to breaking up into the Kingdom of Naples comprising mainland southern Italy, and the Kingdom of Sicily comprising the island of Sicily.
Kingdom of the Two Sicilies, 1816–1861. The result of the reunification of the Kingdoms of Naples and Sicily.
Kingdom of the South 1943-1945. The result of occupation by armies of USA and UK in southern Italy during WW II: it was a puppet state under control by AMGOT.

See also
Southern Italy